Discomedusa is a genus of jellyfish in the family Ulmaridae.

References

Ulmaridae
Scyphozoan genera